Ericameria obovata, or Rydberg's goldenbush, is a North American species of flowering shrubs in the family Asteraceae. It has been found only in the state of Utah in the western United States.

Ericameria obovata is a shrub up to 40 cm (16 inches) tall. It has obovate to spatulate leaves up to 30 mm (1.2 inches) long. Flower heads are yellow, usually in clumps of 2 or 3, each head containing both disc florets and ray florets.

References

External links
UC Calphotos photos gallery

obovata
Endemic flora of the United States
Flora of Utah
Flora of the Colorado Plateau and Canyonlands region
Plants described in 1900
Flora without expected TNC conservation status